Tarascon-sur-Ariège (literally Tarascon on Ariège; Languedocien: Tarascon d’Arièja) is a commune in the Ariège department in southwestern France. Tarascon-sur-Ariège station has rail connections to Toulouse, Foix and Latour-de-Carol.

Population
Inhabitants of Tarascon-sur-Ariège are called Tarasconnais in French.

See also
 Col de Port
 Communes of the Ariège department

References

External links

 HD panoramic of Tarascon-sur-Ariège

Communes of Ariège (department)
Ariège communes articles needing translation from French Wikipedia